Chakdor Namgyal was the third Chogyal (king) of Sikkim. He succeeded Tensung Namgyal in 1700 and was succeeded himself by Gyurmed Namgyal in 1717.

His half-sister Pende Ongmu tried to dethrone Chakdor, who fled to Lhasa, but was reinstated as king with the help of Tibetans.

References

External links
History of Sikkim

Monarchs of Sikkim
1686 births
1717 deaths